Monical's Pizza is an American regional pizza chain, which, as of 2019, consists of over 60 locations in Illinois, Indiana, Missouri and Wisconsin. About half of the locations are franchised, while the others are owned by the corporation. The company was founded in 1959 by the Monical family in Tolono, Illinois. The corporate office is located in Bradley, Illinois.

See also
 List of pizza chains of the United States

References

External links

Companies based in Kankakee County, Illinois
Restaurants in Illinois
Economy of the Midwestern United States
Regional restaurant chains in the United States
Pizza chains of the United States
Restaurants established in 1959
Pizza franchises
1959 establishments in Illinois